Raopura is an area of Vadodara city, Gujarat, India.  It is located in the Eastern part of the city.

The Chimnabai Clock Tower, Kothi Kacheri (Vadodara District Collectorate & Commissioner Office) are situated in this area. Raopura is a shopping area for  citizens of Vadodara. It has large-small commercial shops. 

Urban and suburban areas of Vadodara